The Scott Thomas Beauchamp controversy concerns the publication of a series of diaries by Scott Thomas Beauchamp  (b. 1983 St. Louis, Missouri) – a private in the United States Army, serving in the Iraq War, and a member of Alpha Company, 1-18 Infantry, Second Brigade Combat Team, First Infantry Division.

In 2007, using the pen name "Scott Thomas", Beauchamp filed three entries in The New Republic (TNR) about serving at forward operating base Falcon, Baghdad. These entries concerned alleged  misconduct by soldiers, including Beauchamp, in post-invasion Iraq.

Several publications and bloggers questioned Beauchamp's statements. A U.S. Army investigation had concluded the statements in the material were false.  The New Republic investigated the statements, first standing by the content of Beauchamp's articles for several months, then concluding that they could no longer stand by this material.

"Shock Troops"

In a diary entry in The New Republic, Beauchamp claims he ridiculed a woman in Iraq whose face had been severely burned: "I love chicks that have been intimate with IEDs" (improvised explosive devices), Beauchamp quotes himself as saying, loudly, to his friends in the chow hall. "It really turns me on—melted skin, missing limbs, plastic noses," he recounted. "My friend was practically falling out of his chair laughing...The disfigured woman slammed her cup down and ran out of the chow hall."

Next, he described finding the remains of children in a mass grave uncovered while his unit constructed a combat outpost: "One private...found the top part of a human skull... As he marched around with the skull on his head, people dropped shovels and sandbags, folding in half with laughter ... No one was disgusted. Me included."

Finally, Beauchamp described another soldier "who only really enjoyed driving Bradley Fighting Vehicles because it gave him the opportunity to run things over. He took out curbs, concrete barriers, corners of buildings, stands in the market, and his favorite target: dogs."  Beauchamp described how the soldier killed three dogs in one day: "He slowed the Bradley down to lure the first kill in, and, as the diesel engine grew quieter, the dog walked close enough for him to jerk the machine hard to the right and snag its leg under the tracks."

"Baghdad Diarist"
After the publication of "Shock Troops", The Weekly Standard and National Review questioned the veracity of Beauchamp's statements.  For example, The Weekly Standard reported that one of the anonymous military experts consulted by TNR refuted Beauchamp's allegations regarding Bradley Fighting Vehicles.  As the controversy continued, The Washington Post reported that Beauchamp did not provide documentation for his three published columns.

In a follow-up posting on The New Republic, Beauchamp objected to charges of falsification: "It's been maddening...to see the plausibility of events that I witnessed questioned by people who have never served in Iraq. I was initially reluctant to take the time out of my already insane schedule fighting an actual war in order to play some role in an ideological battle that I never wanted to join."

New Republic editor Franklin Foer disclosed that Beauchamp was married to Elle Reeve, a former New Republic reporter and fact checker, and that his relationship with Reeve was "part of the reason why we found him to be a credible writer." Accused of insufficient fact-checking, the magazine had, according to Foer, planned to "re-report every detail", but the magazine later stated that their investigation was "short circuited" after the Army severed Beauchamp's communications with anyone overseas.

New Republic investigation

In an August 2 statement, after an internal investigation, editors for The New Republic defended Beauchamp's statements, with one exception—that the conversation about the disfigured woman had occurred at Camp Buehring in Kuwait, not Iraq, an error for which The New Republic apologized to its readers.  According to the statement, five anonymous members of Beauchamp's company had also confirmed the other aspects of Beauchamp's entry.

The statement continued to say that the Army's investigation had impeded their own investigation, because communication with Beauchamp had been cut off, and "his fellow soldiers no longer feel comfortable communicating with reporters...If further substantive information comes to light, TNR will, of course, share it with you."
The New Republic's Jason Zengerle was told by the Army there was no evidence of a horribly burned woman at a Kuwait base camp after the magazine published its Editor's Note on the matter. Peter Scoblic, executive editor of TNR, has stated to Beauchamp directly that "I understand why there are questions being raised about the piece".

On August 9, 2007, a spokesman for the 4th Brigade, 1st Infantry Division clarified the results of the Army investigation in an e-mail interview with the Associated Press:

A July 31, 2007 memorandum from Major John D. Cross, the Investigating Officer, entitled "Legal Review of AR 15-6 Investigation Regarding Allegations of Soldier Misconduct Published in The New Republic" found:
 That the incident of blatant disrespect for a disfigured woman in the FOB Falcon DFAC is a tale completely fabricated by Private Beauchamp.  (The New Republic issued a correction saying the story took place in Kuwait, not Iraq.)
 That the desecration of human remains and the discovery of a "Saddam-era dumping ground" is false.
 That the deliberate targeting of wild dogs is completely unfounded.
 That Private Beauchamp desired to use his experiences to enhance his writing and provide legitimacy to his work possibly becoming the next Hemmingway [sic].
 That Private Beauchamp is not a credible source for making the allegation he wrote about in "Shock Troops." He admitted that he was not an eyewitness to the targeting of dogs and only saw animal bones during the construction of Combat Outpost Ellis. Combined with the piece of fiction that he wrote on 8 May 2006 on his blog, I find that Private Beauchamp takes small bits of truth and twists and exaggerates them into fictional account that he puts forth as the whole truth for public consumption.

In a "Memorandum of Concern" the commanding officer of Beauchamp's battalion, Lieutenant Colonel George A. Glaze, wrote in part:

Alleged recantation
On August 6, 2007, the Weekly Standard'''s blog reported that Scott Thomas Beauchamp recanted under oath to Army investigators.Franklin Foer. "Fog of War". The New Republic. December, 2007. On August 7, The New Republic reported:

Michael Goldfarb and the Weekly Standard stood by the story.

On October 24, 2007, the Drudge Report website published the transcript of a phone call that occurred on September 7, 2007 between Beauchamp and senior TNR staff, including Franklin Foer. In this conversation, Beauchamp refused to affirm the accuracy of his reports, despite pressure from Foer to do so. Foer confirmed the accuracy of the transcript, but asserted that Beauchamp did not recant his story and claimed that independent, anonymous sources have backed up Beauchamps's charges and therefore TNR will not retract the stories.  Kathryn Jean Lopez, National Review Online's editor also questioned the accuracy of Drudge's characterization of The New Republic interview as a recantation.

Hours later, the documents were no longer available at the Drudge Report. National Review Online posted the documents on its website. These documents, and other details of the Army investigation, in spite of being confirmed by National Review'' as real, were not officially released.  "We are not going into the details of the investigation," Maj. Steven F. Lamb, deputy public affairs officer in Baghdad, wrote in an e-mail message. "The allegations are false, [Beauchamp's] platoon and company were interviewed, and no one could substantiate the claims he made."

The New Republic "cannot stand by these stories"
A December 2007 article by Franklin Foer lengthily addresses the issues of the controversy, concluding:

See also
 John E. Hatley – Beauchamp's First Sergeant, later convicted of war crimes

References

External links

 
 
 
 Transcript of Beauchamp, Foer, and Peter Scoblic (PDF)

1983 births
United States Army personnel of the Iraq War
Hoaxes in the United States
Journalism ethics
Journalistic hoaxes
Living people
The New Republic
United States Army soldiers
University of Missouri alumni